Michael Nielsen  may refer to:
 Michael Nielsen (born 1974), an Australian-American quantum physicist
 Michael Nielsen (cyclist) (born 1975), Danish cyclist
 Michael Nielsen (sport shooter) (born 1975), Danish sport shooter
 Michael Mio Nielsen (born 1965), Danish footballer